The 1957 NCAA Golf Championship was the 19th annual NCAA-sanctioned golf tournament to determine the individual and team national champions of men's collegiate golf in the United States.

The tournament was held at The Broadmoor in Colorado Springs, Colorado.

Defending champions Houston won the team title, the Cougars' second NCAA team national title.

Individual results

Individual champion
 Rex Baxter, Houston

Tournament medalists
 Roger Rubendall, Wisconsin (139)
 Warren Simmons, Syracuse (139)

Team results

Note: Top 10 only
DC = Defending champions

References

NCAA Men's Golf Championship
Golf in Colorado
NCAA Golf Championship
NCAA Golf Championship
NCAA Golf Championship